Plechelm, O.S.B. (Plechelm of Guelderland, Plechelm, also Pleghelm or Plechelmus; died 730), is honoured as a saint in both the Catholic Church and the Old Catholic Church as a patron saint of the Netherlands.

Plechelm was an Irish Benedictine monk who traveled to Rome with two fellow monks, Saints Wiro and Otger. He became a missionary first in Northumbria, England, and then in the Kingdom of Frisia, now the Netherlands. He died in Sint Odiliënberg.

Plechem was canonized by Pope Agapetus II about 950. As a result, the Basilica of St. Plechelm in Oldenzaal was built to enshrine his remains in 954.

External links
Catholic Saints
Catholic Forum

730 deaths
People from Leinster
Irish Benedictines
8th-century Irish priests
Irish Christian missionaries
Burials in Overijssel
Benedictine saints
Irish Roman Catholic saints
Dutch Roman Catholic saints
8th-century Christian saints
Colombanian saints
Year of birth unknown
Christian missionaries in the Netherlands
Christian missionaries in England